The Eyes were a British psychedelic rock band, formed in 1964 and disbanded in 1967. During 1965 and 1966, they released a number of singles such as "When the Night Falls",  "The Immediate Pleasure", "You're Too Much" and "I'm Rowed Out".

The Eyes were Barry Allchin (bass), Brian Corcoran (drums), Phil Heatley (guitar), Chris Lovegrove (lead guitar) and Terry Nolder (vocals). The band evolved out of an outfit called The Renegades, an instrumental combo, who, when they added a vocalist, became known as Gerry Hart and The Hartbeats. The name change to The Eyes came during 1964. The Eyes made one of the most collectable EPs of the sixties era. The Arrival of the Eyes was released in 1966, and contained both sides of their first two singles, "When The Night Falls" / "I'm Rowed Out" and "The Immediate Pleasure" / "My Degeneration".

Rare Record Price Guide links the album A Tribute To The Rolling Stones, by The Pupils, with The Eyes - The Pupils being a likely pseudonym for "The Eyes".

Punk band
Not related to the psychedelic band, The Eyes were an American punk band formed during the late-70’s first wave of punk rock, from Los Angeles. 

The Eyes were fronted by Joe Ramirez, with David Brown of The Screamers playing the organ. Charlotte Caffey played bass for the Eyes, before joining The Go-Go’s. 

In 1979, The Eyes released a 7in single, “TAQN b/w Topological Lies”, from Dangerhouse Records.

References

British rock music groups